Long Ranger may refer to:

Bell 206L LongRanger, a stretched variant of the Bell 206 JetRanger helicopter
Long Ranger, a multiplayer class in the video game Conker: Live & Reloaded

See also
Lone Ranger (disambiguation)
Long range (disambiguation)